Tmeticides is a monotypic genus of Malagasy sheet weavers containing the single species, Tmeticides araneiformis. It was first described by Embrik Strand in 1907, and is only found on Madagascar.

See also
 List of Linyphiidae species (Q–Z)

References

Linyphiidae
Monotypic Araneomorphae genera
Spiders of Madagascar
Taxa named by Embrik Strand